Eric Michael Williams (born February 24, 1962) is a retired American football defensive lineman who played in the National Football League (NFL).

High school career
Williams attended and played high school football at St. Mary's High School in Stockton, California.

College career
Williams played college football at Washington State University and was voted All Pac-10.

Professional career
Williams played for the Detroit Lions between 1984 and 1989 and the Washington Redskins between 1990 and 1993.  He was drafted in the third round of the 1984 NFL Draft.  Williams was a starting defensive tackle with the Redskins in 1991 that went 14-2 and won Super Bowl XXVI. On an episode of The Tonight Show with Conan O'Brien, Michael Strahan called Williams the meanest player he ever met.

After football
Williams served as founder and CEO of Applied Sports Technology, an online college athletic recruiting service.

Personal life
His father Roy O. Williams also played in the NFL for the San Francisco 49ers while his nephew Kyle Williams was a standout for the USC Trojans before becoming a Seattle Seahawks offensive lineman.

References

1962 births
Living people
Players of American football from Stockton, California
American football defensive tackles
Washington State Cougars football players
Detroit Lions players
Washington Redskins players
Ed Block Courage Award recipients